Range of Motion may refer to:

 Range of motion, the distance an object may travel while attached to another
 Range of Motion (exercise machine)
 Range of Motion, a 1995 book by Elizabeth Berg
 Range of Motion (film), a 2000 American made-for-television film